Proprietary trading (also known as prop trading) occurs when a trader trades stocks, bonds, currencies, commodities, their derivatives, or other financial instruments with the firm's own money (instead of using depositors' money) in order to make a profit for itself. Proprietary trading can create potential conflicts of interest such as insider trading and front running.

Proprietary traders may use a variety of strategies such as index arbitrage, statistical arbitrage, merger arbitrage, fundamental analysis, volatility arbitrage, or global macro trading, much like a hedge fund. Many reporters and analysts believe that large banks purposely leave ambiguous the proportion of proprietary versus non-proprietary trading, because it is felt that proprietary trading is riskier and results in more volatile profits.

Arbitrage
One of the main strategies of trading, traditionally associated with banks, is arbitrage. In the most basic sense, arbitrage is defined as taking advantage of a price discrepancy through the purchase or sale of certain combinations of securities to lock in a market-neutral profit. The trade will remain subject to various non-market risks, such as settlement risk and other operational risks. Investment banks, which are often active in many markets around the world, constantly watch for arbitrage opportunities.

One of the more-notable areas of arbitrage, called risk arbitrage or merger arbitrage, evolved in the 1980s. When a company plans to buy another company, often the share price of the buyer falls (because the buyer will have to pay money to buy the other company) and the share price of the purchased company rises (because the buyer usually buys those shares at a price higher than the current price). When an investment bank believes a buyout is imminent, it often sells short the shares of the buyer (betting that the price will go down) and buys the shares of the company being acquired (betting the price will go up).

Conflicts of interest
There are a number of ways in which proprietary trading can create conflicts of interest between a bank's interests and those of its customers.

As investment banks are key figures in mergers and acquisitions, it is possible (though prohibited) for traders to use inside information to engage in merger arbitrage. Investment banks are required to have a Chinese wall separating their trading and investment banking divisions; however, in recent years, especially since the Enron scandal, these have come under closer scrutiny. One example of an alleged conflict of interest can be found in charges brought by the Australian Securities & Investments Commission against Citigroup in 2007.

Another source of conflicts of interest is potential front running, in which case the buy-side clients suffer from significantly higher trading costs. Front running per se is illegal, but there are circumstances under which a broker that operates a proprietary trading desk gains advantage over its clients based on inferences from order book data.

Famous traders 
Famous proprietary traders have included Ivan Boesky, Steven A. Cohen, John Meriwether, Daniel Och, and Boaz Weinstein. Some of the investment banks most historically associated with trading were Salomon Brothers and Drexel Burnham Lambert. Trader Nick Leeson took down Barings Bank with unauthorized proprietary positions. UBS trader Kweku Adoboli lost $2.2 billion of the bank's money and was convicted for his actions. 

Armin S, a German private trader, sued BNP Paribas for 152m EUR because they sold to him structured products for 108 EUR each which were worth 54 00 EUR.

Notable proprietary trading firms 

 Akuna Capital
 Citadel Securities
 DRW Trading Group
 Flow Traders
 Hudson River Trading
 IMC Financial Markets
 Jane Street Capital 
 Jump Trading
 Optiver
 Squarepoint Capital
 Susquehanna International Group
 Tower Research
 Tradebot
 TransMarket Group
 Virtu Financial
 XTX Markets

See also
 Flow trading

References 

Financial markets